Brookthorpe is a village and former civil parish, now in the parish of Brookthorpe-with-Whaddon, in the Stroud district, in the county of Gloucestershire, England. In 1931 the parish had a population of 194. It has a church called St Swithun's Church.

History 
The name "Brookthorpe" means 'Brook outlying hamlet'. Brookthorpe was recorded in the Domesday Book as Brostorp.

On 1 April 1935 the parish of Whaddon was merged with Brookthorpe, on 3 July 1956 the parish was renamed "Brookthorpe with Whaddon".

References

External links
 Stroud Voices (Brookthorpe filter) - oral history site

Villages in Gloucestershire
Former civil parishes in Gloucestershire
Stroud District